Carabus lefebvrei lefebvrei is a bluish-black-coloured subspecies of ground beetle in the  Carabinae subfamily, that can be found in Italy and Sicily.

References

lefebvrei lefebvrei
Beetles described in 1826